Santiago Barriga Cane Jr. is a Filipino politician from the province of Agusan del Sur, Philippines where he currently serves as Governor. He was the Vice Governor of the province from 2016 to 2019 and was re-elected in 2019 as a Governor.

References

Living people
National Unity Party (Philippines) politicians
People from Agusan del Sur
Year of birth missing (living people)